Breiðafjörður (wide fjord) is a large shallow bay, about 50 km wide and 125 km long, in the west of Iceland. It separates the region of the Westfjords (Vestfirðir) from the Snæfellsnes peninsula to the south. Breiðafjörður is encircled by mountains, including Kirkjufell and the glacier Snæfellsjökull on the Snæfellsnes peninsula, and the Látrabjarg bird cliffs at the tip of the Westfjords. Numerous smaller fjords extend inland from Breiðafjörður, the largest being Hvammsfjörður at its southeastern corner. An interesting feature of the bay is that the land to the north was formed about 15 million years ago, whereas the land to the south was formed less than half that time ago.

Nature 

Breiðafjörður has a spectacular land and seascape consisting of shallow seas, small fjords and bays, and intertidal areas, dotted with about 3,000 islands, islets and skerries. The area contains about half of Iceland's intertidal area and tides can be six metres. The bedrock was formed during rift volcanism in the late Tertiary. The area consists mainly of basaltic lava that was deeply eroded by glaciers during the quaternary age, creating a diverse landscape. There are several geothermal sites, some visible only at low tide.

Plants and animals 
The big intertidal zone is high in biodiversity and productivity and has extensive algal forests and other important habitats for fish and  invertebrates. The area supports 230 species of vascular plants and around 50 breeding bird species including common shag, glaucous gull, white-tailed eagle, common eider, black guillemot and grey phalarope. The area is important staging area for brent goose and red knot. The common seal and the grey seal  have their main haul-out on the islands and skerries.

Several species of cetaceans are commonly found including common porpoise, white-beaked dolphin, killer whale and minke whale.

Islands 

The islands in Breiðafjörður have an unbroken history of human use, but now only Flatey is inhabited year-round. Many islands are used for summer residences and for harvesting of natural resources such as eiderdown. Some of the islands are:
 Flatey
 Brokey
 Skáleyjar
 Hvallátur
 Svefneyjar
 Sviðnur
 Hergilsey
 Elliðaey

Economy and Ecology 
Fisheries, tourism and algal harvesting are other major uses of the area. South of Reykhólar, on a small island offshore, Norður & Co. manufactures sea salt obtained by evaporation of seawater using geothermal energy. The process was first used in this region in 1753 and was chosen by Soren Røsenkilde when he established Norður in 2012.

Breiðafjörður is the spawning ground for some of Iceland's most important economic fish species.

Transport 
From the little port of Stykkishólmur on the Snæfellsnes peninsula, a ferry crosses Breiðafjörður to Brjánslækur in the Westfjords, stopping at the island of Flatey on the way. It is also possible to circle around Breiðafjörður overland, by car. If the weather is fine, it is possible to see the coast line of the Westfjords from the Snæfellsnes peninsula, at a distance of up to 40 km.

Culture and history 

During the Middle Ages, especially in the 12th century, there was a monastery of Augustine monks on the island of Flatey which formed an important centre of Icelandic culture. The most extensive medieval manuscript, the Flateyjarbók was written there. Afterwards, the island was an important trading post and also home to a printing press.

External links

 Marine Protected areas p.28

Fjords of Iceland
Western Region (Iceland)